Lebanon competed at the 2012 Winter Youth Olympics in Innsbruck, Austria. The Lebanese team consisted of just two athletes in one sport, alpine skiing.

Alpine skiing

Lebanon qualified one boy and one girl in alpine skiing.

Boy

Girl

See also
Lebanon at the 2012 Summer Olympics

References

2012 in Lebanese sport
Nations at the 2012 Winter Youth Olympics
Lebanon at the Youth Olympics